Road signs in Colombia are similar to those of other South American countries. Many regulatory signs are based on European signs, while many warning signs are based on U.S. and Canadian signs, i.e. on MUTCD.

Colombia uses the metric system of measurement and drives on the right.

Warning signs

Prohibitory signs

Guide signs

Traffic lights

External links
(Spanish) Medellin Secretary of Mobility - Colombian road signs

Colombia